The Ayer Rajah Expressway (AYE) extends from the western end of the Marina Coastal Expressway in the south of Singapore to Tuas in the west near the Tuas Second Link to Malaysia. Together with the Marina Coastal Expressway and the East Coast Parkway, it forms a second east-west link to complement the role played by the Pan Island Expressway.

As from 29 December 2013, ECP and AYE are no longer linked together after MCE was opened.

History
Construction on the expressway commenced in 1983, with the first two phases completed by 1988. This section involved the widening of several existing roads along the way, such as Ayer Rajah Road and Upper Ayer Rajah Road, as well as the construction of what was then the longest road viaduct, the Keppel Viaduct, from where the eastern end of the expressway commences. The road extends from Alexandra Road until the Keppel Road. It ends at Teban Flyover along Jurong Town Hall Road.

With the construction beginning from 5 December 1993, the existing Jalan Ahmad Ibrahim from Tuas West Drive to Jurong Town Hall Road was widened and merged into Ayer Rajah Expressway which was opened on 18 November 1997. The expressway was extended to Tuas from the Teban Flyover in conjunction with the opening of the Tuas Second Link to Johor on 2 January 1998. This construction, which followed the alignment of Jalan Ahmad Ibrahim, involved the expansion of the existing road to match with the width of the rest of the AYE, construction of "filter" roads on both sides of the expressway (which eventually took the name of Jalan Ahmad Ibrahim), and the building of five flyovers and two underpasses. It meets up with the Pan Island Expressway at the Tuas Flyover.

Its eastern end used to be the East Coast Parkway, but the ECP was truncated and the Marina Coastal Expressway has taken over the role, and connects AYE to the KPE and ECP on 29 December 2013.

Gallery

List of exits

See also
East Coast Parkway

References

External links

Expressways in Singapore
Boon Lay
Bukit Merah
Clementi
Downtown Core (Singapore)
Jurong East
Jurong West
Pioneer, Singapore
Queenstown, Singapore
Tuas
Articles containing video clips